Lilaea is a monotypic genus of aquatic plants containing the single species Lilaea scilloides, which is known by the common names flowering quillwort, awl-leaf lilaea, and simply lilaea. The taxonomy of this plant has been in debate, with some authors assigning it to a family of its own named Lilaeaceae, and others keeping it in the small arrowgrass family, Juncaginaceae. It is native throughout the Americas and it can be found elsewhere as an introduced species, particularly in Australia. This is an annual herb growing in or just next to water in several types of shallow aquatic habitat, including vernal pools, mudflats, and ditches. The plant takes the form of a tuft of basal leaves around a very short stem. Each onionlike leaf is very narrow, long and pointed, reaching 25 to 40 centimeters long. It is wrapped in a translucent sheath at the base. The inflorescences include clusters of staminate and bisexual flowers at the tip of a narrow stalk as well as pistillate flowers in underwater axils. The pistillate flower is composed of a threadlike style which may be up to 20 centimeters long tipped with a stigma which floats on the water surface. The fruit is a beaked, ribbed nutlet up to a centimeter long.

References

External links
Jepson Manual Treatment
USDA Plants Profile
Photo gallery

Juncaginaceae
Plants described in 1804
Aquatic plants
Taxa named by Aimé Bonpland